Complete Collapse is the seventh studio album by American rock band Sleeping with Sirens. It was released on October 14, 2022, by Sumerian Records. It serves as a follow-up to their sixth studio album, How It Feels to Be Lost (2019). It is their first album to feature drummer Matty Best of Tonight Alive who replaced longtime drummer Gabe Barham. It is also their final album to feature longtime guitarist Jack Fowler, who departed the band before the album's release. The album also features guest appearances Spencer Chamberlain of Underoath, Charlotte Sands, Royal & the Serpent and Dorothy.

Promotion
On June 2, 2021, Sleeping with Sirens released the song "Bloody Knuckles" as the lead single of the then-untitled album. A second single, "Crosses", which features Spencer Chamberlain of Underoath, was released on June 22, 2022 simultaneously with the album's announcement, followed by the releases of two promotional singles "Let You Down" featuring Charlotte Sands, and "Ctrl + Alt + Del" on August 11, 2022. The final single "Complete Collapse" was released on September 14, 2022, alongside an accompanying music video.

Track listing

Personnel
Sleeping with Sirens
 Kellin Quinn – lead vocals
 Nick Martin – rhythm guitar, backing vocals
 Jack Fowler – lead guitar, programming
 Justin Hills – bass guitar, backing vocals
 Matty Best – drums, percussion
Additional Personnel
 Spencer Chamberlain – vocals (Crosses)
 Charlotte Sands – vocals (Let You Down)
 Royal & the Serpent – vocals (Be Happy)
 Dorothy – vocals (Us)
Production
 Producer – Andrew Marcus Baylis, Zakk Cervini
 Programming – Randy Slaugh

Charts

References

2022 albums
Sleeping with Sirens albums
Sumerian Records albums